Personal Journals is the first solo studio album by American rapper Sage Francis. It was released on Anticon in 2002. It peaked at number 8 on CMJ's Hip-Hop chart. As of 2005, it has sold 36,000 units.

Critical reception

Chris Dahlen of Pitchfork gave the album an 8.7 out of 10, saying, "Personal Journals is a success because it turns the self-examination into poetry and then, harder still, turns the poems into great rap." Stanton Swihart of AllMusic gave the album 4 stars out of 5, saying, "The soundscapes that his team of producers came up with are every bit as unorthodox and superlative." Clay Jarvis of Stylus Magazine gave the album a grade of "A−," calling it "the finest hip hop album of this year."

Daniel Thomas-Glass of Dusted Magazine said, "The combination of Sage Francis's boldly self-searching poetry with the beats of some of underground hip hop's most talented producers is out-and-out breathtaking, from the opener 'Crack Pipes,' that brilliantly flips Sixtoo's impossible-to-rhyme-over beat from his instrumental opus The Secrets That Houses Keep, to the closing bars of 'Runaways,' the Joey Beats-produced outro that is quite haunting in its beauty."

Track listing

Personnel
Credits adapted from liner notes.

 Sage Francis – vocals, recording, mixing, cover art design
 Sixtoo – production (1, 2, 11, 15, 16), recording, mixing
 DJ Mayonnaise – production (3, 4)
 Jel – production (5, 8)
 Scott Matelic – production (6)
 Reanimator – production (7)
 Alias – production (9)
 Odd Nosdam – production (10), layout
 Controller 7 – production (12)
 Mr. Dibbs – production (14), recording, mixing
 Joe Beats – production (18)
 DJ Mek – turntables (3)
 DJ Signify – turntables (7, 8)
 Mike 2600 – turntables (7)
 Grey Matter – turntables (15)
 Jay Peters – guitar (17)
 Matt Zimmerman – upright bass (17)
 Tara – keyboards (17)
 Matt Coolige – flute (17)
 Scott Begin – drums (17)
 Shalem B – turntables (17)
 Chris Warren – recording, mixing
 Jonathan Wyman – mastering
 Kara Healy – photography

References

External links
 
 

2002 debut albums
Sage Francis albums
Anticon albums
Albums produced by Alias (musician)
Albums produced by Jel (music producer)
Albums produced by Odd Nosdam